Akyazı is a town and district of Sakarya Province in the Marmara region of Turkey. The mayor is Bilal Soykan (AK PARTI).

Electrocution incident 
On 23 June 2017, five people died of electrocution after a swimming pool at a water park in Akyazı became electrified. Three children aged 12, 15 and 17 were the first to be electrocuted. The park's manager Mehmet Kaya, 58, and his son Kadir Kaya, 30, dived in to save them but were also seriously injured. The five victims died in hospital; another person was seriously injured during the incident and was taken to hospital.

Notable people
 Sofuoğlu family, three champion motorcycle racers

References

External links 
 Akyazı Haber
 Sakarya Haber

Populated places in Sakarya Province